The 22829/22830 Shalimar–Bhuj Weekly Superfast Express is a Superfast Express train belonging to South Eastern Railway zone that runs between  of Kolkata and  of Kutch in India. It is currently being operated with 22829/22830 train numbers on a weekly basis.

Coach composition

The train has Modern LHB rakes with max speed of 130 kmph. The train consists of 22 coaches:

 2 AC II Tier
 6 AC III Tier
 10 Sleeper Coaches
 2 General Unreserved
 2 End on Generation (EOG) Coaches

Service

22829/ Bhuj–Shalimar Weekly Superfast Express has an average speed of 57 km/hr and covers 2419 km in 42 hrs 25 mins.

22830/ Shalimar–Bhuj Weekly Superfast Express has an average speed of 57 km/hr and covers 2419 km in 42 hrs 25 mins.

Route & Halts 

The important halts of the train are:

Schedule

Direction reversal

Train reverses its direction one times at :

Rake sharing

Train shares its rake with 22825/22826 Shalimar–Chennai Central Weekly Superfast Express, 18009/18010 Santragachi–Ajmer Weekly Express and 22851/22852 Santragachi–Mangalore Central Vivek Express.

Traction

After Ahmedabad Junction, both trains are hauled by a Diesel Loco Shed, Vatva or Diesel Loco Shed, Ratlam-based WDM-3A or WDM-3D up to Bhuj, and vice versa.

References

Transport in Bhuj
Rail transport in Howrah
Express trains in India
Rail transport in Gujarat
Rail transport in Madhya Pradesh
Rail transport in Chhattisgarh
Rail transport in Odisha
Rail transport in West Bengal
Rail transport in Jharkhand
Railway services introduced in 2013